Andrew or Andy Dawson may refer to:

 Anderson Dawson (Andrew Dawson, 1863–1910), Australian politician, Premier of Queensland for one week in 1899
 Andrew Dawson (record producer) (born 1980), American music producer, engineer, mixer and songwriter
 Andrew Dawson, British comedy writer of the Dawson Bros.
 Andy Dawson (born 1978), English footballer
 Andy Dawson (footballer, born 1979), English footballer
 Andy Dawson (podcaster), British freelance writer and podcaster